Joshua William R. Basham (born 17 April 1999) is a professional rugby player who plays as a flanker for London Irish in Premiership Rugby

Basham made his professional debut for London Irish during the 2017-18 season, eventually making 3 more appearances. Basham transferred away from London Irish to start university at Durham University, paving the way for him to link up with Newcastle Falcons.

In May 2018, Basham was included in the England Under-20 squad for the 2018 World Rugby Under 20 Championship. He was named as a starter in the final, which saw England finish runners up to hosts France.

In April 2021, Basham was promoted from the Newcastle Falcons academy to the first team squad for the following season.

He returned to London Irish prior to the 2022/23 season.

References

External links
ESPN Scrum profile

1999 births
Living people
Alumni of Hatfield College, Durham
Durham University RFC players
English rugby union players
London Irish players
People educated at Wellington College, Berkshire
Rugby union players from Slough